Antanetikely is a rural commune in Analamanga Region, in the  Central Highlands of Madagascar. It belongs to the district of Antananarivo-Atsimondrano and its populations numbers to 10,511 in 2018.

Rivers
The commune is crossed by the Andromba river from south to west. Also the Sisaony crosses the commune.

References

Populated places in Analamanga